Khaled Labib (born 3 January 1997) is an Egyptian professional squash player who currently plays for Egypt men's national squash team. He achieved his highest career PSA singles ranking of 149 in March 2020 during the 2019-20 PSA World Tour.

References

External links 

 Profile at PSA
 

1997 births
Living people
Egyptian male squash players
Sportspeople from Cairo
21st-century Egyptian people